Luigi Caetani (July 1595 – 15 April 1642) was an Italian Cardinal of the Roman Catholic Church.

Biography
Caetani was born in Piedimonte. Son of Filippo I Caetani, duke of Sermoneta, and Camilla Gaetani dell'Aquila d'Aragona, of the dukes of Traetto.  Descendant of the family of Pope Boniface VIII, great-grand-nephew of Cardinal Niccolò Caetani, grand-nephew of Cardinal Enrico Caetani and nephew of Cardinals Bonifazio Caetani and Antonio Caetani (seniore), he studied first in Ravenna, where his uncle Bonifazio was legate, and then in Rome, where he obtained a doctorate in law.

He served as Archbishop of Capua from 17 March 1624 until his resignation on 1 March 1627. He was ordained a bishop on 12 June 1622 and appointed the coadjutor archbishop of Capua on 14 November 1622. Caetani was elevated to cardinal on 19 January 1626 and installed as the cardinal-priest of S. Pudenziana on 9 February 1626.

Cardinal Caetani was consecrated to the episcopacy by Ludovico Ludovisi. Having himself consecrated Ulderico Carpegna, Caetani is in the episcopal lineage of Pope Francis and Pope Benedict XVI.

Episcopal succession

References

External links 
 (for Chronology of Bishops) 
 (for Chronology of Bishops) 

17th-century Italian cardinals
Cardinals created by Pope Urban VIII
1595 births
1642 deaths
Latin Patriarchs of Antioch
17th-century Italian Roman Catholic archbishops